The 1978 World Rowing Championships were World Rowing Championships that were held from 30 October to 5 November at Lake Karapiro near Cambridge, New Zealand. Twenty-eight countries were represented at the regatta. In the history of the World Rowing Championships, 1978 was the only year when the lightweight rowing championships were not held in conjunction with the open men and women event; the lightweight events had already been held in Copenhagen, Denmark, in August.

Background

Lake Karapiro was formed in 1947 through a hydroelectric project on the Waikato River. It was soon recognised as the best rowing venue in New Zealand, and was used for the 1950 British Empire Games. World rowing championships had been held since 1962 by FISA, the World Rowing Federation, and in 1974 New Zealand was provisionally awarded the 1978 world event. Don Rowlands, who had won rowing medals at British Empire and Commonwealth Games in the 1950s and would later become chairman of the 1978 World Rowing Championships organising committee, had lobbied for the event to come to New Zealand; prior to 1978, the event had always been held in the Northern Hemisphere. He found a supporter in Thomas Keller, the president of FISA. There was also some curiosity amongst the rowing fraternity how a small island nation from the South Pacific managed to win gold medals at the 1968 and 1972 Summer Olympics, in men's coxed four and men's eight, respectively. But it was not until the 1976 Summer Olympics that 1978 event was confirmed, which left only two years to organise the event.

The entire event was organised by volunteers; the organising committee had no people in employment. Cyril Hilliard was the secretary of the organising committee. Volunteer labour erected a grandstand; all built with scaffolding. As Rowlands was a marine engineer, he designed the starting pontoon himself and the construction was carried out by James Hill, a former Olympic rower who was a joiner by trade. Hill also built the start and finish towers. A company donated 13 kit houses, and these were used as offices. Catering for the competitors was done by the New Zealand Army. It is estimated that in total, close to 100,000 spectators attended the four days of racing. Keller called it afterwards "the greatest regatta in living memory". Former British rower Dickie Burnell, who worked at Karapiro as a correspondent for The Times, labelled the event "the greatest show on water".

Twenty-eight countries were represented by their rowers in 140 boats, and this was the largest international sports competition that the country had organised up to that time. The event made a profit of NZ$155,000, which was used to fund a rowing foundation.

Medal summary

Medallists at the 1978 World Rowing Championships were:

Men's events
In the single sculls and coxless pair boat classes, the first three boats from each heat qualified for the semi-final, and three further semi-finalists were determined via a repechage. In all other boat classes, the first from each heat qualified for the final, with the other finalists determined via a repechage.

Men's lightweight events

In the history of the World Rowing Championships, 1978 was the only year when the lightweight rowing championships were not held in conjunction with the open men and women event. The 1978 FISA Lightweight Championships were held in Copenhagen, Denmark, during August.

Women's events

There were six boats nominated in the coxless pair and they went to the final without heats. In all other boat classes, the winner of each heat qualified for the final and all other finalists were determined via a repechage.

Event codes

New Zealand officials had expected their men to win three or four medals, and Rowlands stated that he expected the men's eight to win gold. In the end, the bronze won by New Zealand's eight was the host's only medal. This table does not include the lightweight events.

Medal table
The medal table excludes the lightweight events.

Finals
The Soviet Union were disqualified in the final of the women's coxed four.

Great Britain
Six men's teams and only one women's team from Great Britain competed at the championships.

References

External links
Photo of the starting tower and pontoon, taken by The New Zealand Herald

Rowing competitions in New Zealand
World Rowing Championships
World Rowing Championships
International sports competitions hosted by New Zealand
1978 in New Zealand sport
Rowing
Rowing